Edmund Lacey (or Lacy; died 1455) was a medieval Bishop of Hereford and Bishop of Exeter in England.

Lacey was educated at University College, Oxford, where he was a mature commoner, then Fellow, and subsequently Master of the College from 1398 until around 1401. The College prospered and developed under him, as well as under John Appleton and John Castell who followed him.

In 1401, Lacey was appointed Canon of the ninth stall at St George's Chapel, Windsor Castle, a position he held until 1417.

Around 1414, Lacey was appointed Dean of the Chapel Royal, accompanying King Henry V to the Battle of Agincourt in 1415.
He was elected to the see of Hereford between 21 January and 17 February 1417 and consecrated on 18 April 1417. He was then translated to the see of Exeter on 15 July 1420. While bishop at Exeter, Lacey promoted the cult of the Archangel Raphael, proclaiming the feast in his diocese in 1443, and working throughout England to institute the cult.

Lacey died on 18 September 1455.
His executors appear as John Cobethorn, Henry Webber, John Germyn and John Burnebyry, all church officials, in 1460;

References

Bibliography
 
 

Year of birth missing
1455 deaths
Alumni of University College, Oxford
14th-century scholars
Fellows of University College, Oxford
Masters of University College, Oxford
Bishops of Hereford
Bishops of Exeter
15th-century English Roman Catholic bishops
Burials at Exeter Cathedral
Deans of the Chapel Royal
Canons of Windsor